Zygmunt Jan Kisielewski (27 March 1882 – 25 April 1942) was a Polish writer, brother of Jan August and father of Stefan. During World War I (1914–1917) he was a combatant in the Polish Legions.  He was an editor of Robotnik (The Worker) from 1918 to 1925.  He also authored books on social-national and military subjects.  His memoir is entitled Poranek.

20th-century Polish male writers
1882 births
1942 deaths
Burials at Powązki Cemetery
Polish legionnaires (World War I)